The 1872 Waikato by-election was a by-election held on 1 March 1872 in the  electorate in the Waikato region of New Zealand during the 5th New Zealand Parliament.

The by-election was caused by the resignation of the incumbent MP James McPherson on 20 December 1871.

The by-election was won by Major William Jackson. He was unopposed.

The election was delayed as the principal polling place was moved from Ngāruawāhia to Hamilton.

References

Waikato 1872
1872 elections in New Zealand
Politics of Waikato
March 1872 events